The 1910 Colorado College Tigers football team represented Colorado College as a member of the Rocky Mountain Conference (RMC) during the 1910 college football season. Led by first-year head coach Claude Rothgeb, the Tigers compiled an overall record of 7–0 with a mark of 4–0 in conference play, sharing the RMC title with Colorado.

Schedule

References

Colorado College
Colorado College Tigers football seasons
Rocky Mountain Athletic Conference football champion seasons
College football undefeated seasons
Colorado College Tigers football